Çapar may refer to:

 Çapar, Göynük, Bolu Province, Turkey
 Çapar, Şabanözü
 Serpil Çapar (born 1981), Turkish handball player